Querer volar (English title: Want to fly) is a Mexican telenovela produced by Patricia Lozano for Televisa in 1980.

Cast 
Rocío Banquells as Erika
Humberto Zurita as Daniel
Maria Eugenia Rios as Dolores
Manolita Saval as Paquita
Agustin Sauret as Javier
Maribel Fernandez as Barbara
Sonia Esquivel as Susana
Daniel Martin as Lus Felipe
Martha Elena Cervantes as Rebeca
Rafael Santa Cruz as Jose Luis
Mari Carmen Martinez as Cecilia

References

External links 

Mexican telenovelas
1980 telenovelas
Televisa telenovelas
Spanish-language telenovelas
1980 Mexican television series debuts
1980 Mexican television series endings